Raaz 3: The Third Dimension is a 2012 Indian 3D horror thriller film directed by Vikram Bhatt, and produced by Mahesh Bhatt and Mukesh Bhatt. The movie features Bipasha Basu as the lead and antangonist along with Emraan Hashmi and Esha Gupta as main characters. The film is the third installment in the Raaz series, which is a sequel to Raaz: The Mystery Continues in 2009, which itself was a sequel to Raaz in 2002. Bipasha Basu, who was a part of the first film of the Raaz series, made a comeback to the series after opting out of the second film. It was one of the films in a series of quasi-sequels released under the Bhatt Banner including Raaz: The Mystery Continues, Murder 2, Jannat 2, Jism 2, 1920: Evil Returns, Murder 3 and Aashiqui 2, each of which had nothing to do with their respective prequels, but somehow fell into the same genre following a similar story.

Plot
Shanaya Shekhar (Bipasha Basu) is an influential bollywood actress who has a passionate affair with famous bollywood film director Aditya Arora (Emraan Hashmi). Her career takes a drastic roll when a debutant actress named Sanjana Krishna (Esha Gupta), receiving accolades and appreciation for her work. Suddenly, Shanaya seems forgotten and everybody only wants to work with Sanjana. Soon enough, Shanaya sees her career fading away and her envy slowly becomes craziness. She turns to black magic and makes it her goal in life to destroy Sanjana's career and make her feel the pain of loss. The fact is, Sanjana is really Shanaya's estranged sister. Shanaya's father loved Sanjana more than Shanaya. So, due to jealous, Shanaya hates Sanjana and try to ruin Sanjana in several ways.

She seeks help of her former servant, Sonu (Sunil Dhariwal), a tantrik who helps her practice black magic and call upon a black magician named Tara Dutt (Manish Choudhary). She asks him to destroy Sanjana's life and career. Tara agrees to help haunt and torture Sanjana until she becomes suicidal. He asks Shanaya to give Sanjana a black poison through a person she trusts. Shanaya seduces Aditya to do it for her. Although reluctant at first, Aditya agrees due to his love for Shanaya but soon he realizes that what he's doing is immoral.

Aditya, whose sympathy for Sanjana has now turned into love, leaves Shanaya and refuses to listen to her any more. To end Aditya's and Sanjana's relation, Shanaya hatches a plan by befriending Sanjana in order to poison her which Aditya gets suspicious about. At a movie premiere, Shanaya reveals that she actually dripped a black magic spell in the chocolates she gave to Sanjana earlier. In the bathroom, Sanjana is attacked by a swarm of Cockroaches, which was really a hallucination due to the black magic of the chocolates given by Shanaya. This cause Sanjana to remove her dress and run back to the party, thus getting her nudity exposed by the paparazzi and the people there. The public wrongly believe this to be a deliberate publicity stunt of hers, causing her career to be the verge of being ruined. Aditya takes her to a hospital and finds out that Shanaya was behind it. In rage, Aditya visits Shanaya's house and damages her possessions, taking away the last bit of the poisonous water.

Agitated, Shanaya seeks Tara Dutt's help again, wanting to kill Sanjana once and for all. Tara Dutt tells Shanaya that life and death are in God's hands and that to fight God he'll need her life force. He tells Shanaya that she has to has sex with him to enable Tara to become powerful enough to fight God, to which Shanaya agrees. At the hospital, with the help of the doctor and a priest, Aditya goes into the spirit world to fight Tara Dutt. A hard fight ensues and Aditya defeats Tara Dutt, rescuing Sanjana's soul in the process. Back in the real world, Shanaya suffers physical damage as a result of the fight between Tara Dutt and Aditya and attempts to kill Aditya and Sanjana, only to meet failure. Aditya protects Sanjana from the defeated Shanaya, who vows that she will forever remain a star and commits suicide by pouring acid on her head, causing her skin to melt to death. Later, the media puts Sanjana off the hook as they conclude her 'publicity stunt' was a result of a nervous breakdown she had due to stress.

The film ends with the moral that our love for others matters more than our love for ourselves.

Cast
 Bipasha Basu as Shanaya Shekhar, the main antagonist and Aditya's ex-girlfriend
 Emraan Hashmi as Aditya Arora, the main protagonist, Shanaya's ex-boyfriend and Sanjana's fiance
 Esha Gupta as Sanjana Shekhar, Shanaya's sister and Aditya's fiancee
 Manish Choudhary as Tara Dutt (Ghost)
 Su
 Mohan Kapoor as Doctor
 Jagat Rawat as Tantrik

Production

Casting
The original choice for the female lead of the film was Jacqueline Fernandez, but she had later dropped out due to not wanting to establish herself as a Bollywood sex symbol, as she was uncomfortable with a scene where cockroaches attack her and she had to be topless in front of 300 people. Fernandez was later replaced with Jannat 2 debutant, Esha Gupta. Bipasha Basu(main female lead and antagonist) will be playing the role of an actress who is a "prisoner of fame". Actor Dino Morea and actress Kangana Ranaut, who were a part of Raaz and Raaz – The Mystery Continues respectively are not a part of the film.Emraan Hashmi will be playing the male lead.

Filming
The film began shooting on 29 January 2012, director Vikram Bhatt explained how confident he is that the film should be completed sometime in Summer 2012 and that Raaz 3 is amongst his most important films.

Promotion

Trailer launch
The Raaz 3 trailer was originally scheduled to be attached with the prints of Rohit Shetty's Bol Bachchan on 6 July 2012. However, it was delayed multiple times due to censoring. The theatrical trailer was officially launched on 30 July 2012 for the media, as confirmed by actress Bipasha Basu. Despite being widely speculated that it would be released to the public also, this was proven false. Later, the theatrical trailer was unveiled for the public as it was released online a day later on 31 July 2012. The theatrical trailer will also be in theatres on 3 August 2012 with Pooja Bhatt's Jism 2, as they are both under the Vishesh Films banner.

Marketing
Raaz 3 was promoted on the Sony TV show C.I.D. Bipasha Basu and Esha Gupta promoted the film by making an appearance on a special episode of CID, which aired on 2 September 2012.

Although, the film was originally planned to release on 31 August 2012 alongside Barfi! and Joker, it was later delayed to avoid clashing with any other big film. Raaz 3 was banned for release in UAE, although is being kept under review for the adult content included in the film.

Soundtrack

The film's music was composed by Jeet Gannguli and Rashid Khan, while the lyrics were penned by Devendra Singh, Sanjay Masoomm and Kumaar.

Release
Raaz 3 released in India and overseas on 7 September 2012. Raaz 3 is India's second-ever 3D horror movie. The movie released in stereoscopic 3D, Imax 3D and 3D worldwide. There are more 3D prints of the movie than its 2D version. Raaz 3 is the biggest release for an Emraan Hashmi film as it released on over 2000 screens in India, including in its 3D format. This movie is Emraan Hashmi's first ever 3D movie. The movie received an Adult Certificate from the Censor Board of India without any cuts.

Critical reception
The movie received mixed reviews from critics. Critics pointed out that the only saving grace of the movie was Bipasha.
Taran Adarsh gave it 3.5/5 stars, commenting "If you are an enthusiast of supernatural thrillers/horror movies, RAAZ 3 should be on your list of 'things to do and watch' this weekend. Go, get ready to be spooked!" Bollywood3 awarded it 3.25/5 stars and wrote," On the whole, Raaz 3 is one movie which has everything going its way. Gritty screenplay, awesome songs and mature performances are sure shot plus points. On the other hand it would be interesting to see how family audience, who love watching popcorn entertainment respond to this film. To those who love edge of the seat horror thrillers, Raaz 3 is one film which is highly recommended. Go buy yourself a ticket and experience the thrill in 3D." Madhureeta Mukherjee of The Times of India gave it 3/5 stars while writing, "For all those who want to move over from the Ramsay Bros... go watch 'Raaz 3' in 3D, at your own risk. But don't take it to your grave." Ananya Bhattacharya of Zee News gave it 3/5 stars and stated that"Watch 'Raaz 3' for Bipasha and its 3D factor."Independent Bollywood gave 3 out of 5 stars and quoted "Some real original scares and chills this time with memorable performances." IBNLive also gave it 3/5 stars calling it a good horror film.

Subhash K. Jha of IANS gave 2 out of 5 stars saying, "It's Bipasha who holds together the feverish proceedings. She delivers a full-bodied gutsy performance." Udita Jhunjhunwala of businessofcinema.com said, "Bhatt gets the rhythm of the suspense-building wrong, going all too rapidly from grotesque decapitation to a kiss and song scene. It does not help that the acting is also at different levels. Most of the burden to convince rests on Basu's fit shoulders – and she does. You do believe that she is menacing and wicked."

Box office

India
Raaz 3 took a good opening of around 50% at multiplexes and 65–70% in single screens on average. The opening at single screens later picked up to an excellent occupancy of 70%–100% over the noon and matinees shows. Raaz 3 went on to collecting approx.  on its opening day, thus becoming the sixteenth film ever to cross the  mark on the opening day itself. The film then went on to collecting approx.  on its second day. Raaz 3 had a huge first week where it had collected . Raaz 3 collected  nett in its second weekend taking its ten-day collection to  nett. The film ultimately grossed  domestically and  worldwide. Box Office India declared the film as a Super Hit.

Overseas
Raaz 3 did not do as well overseas, as it approximately collected around US$1 million ( 55 million) plus in ten days. The film was not released in the UAE, which has been noted to have hit it hard, as it could have been the film's best International market and added another $250,000 plus in revenue. Raaz 3 was declared average by box office India.

Awards and nominations

Reboot
A fourth film in the series, titled Raaz Reboot released on 16 September 2016 .

References

External links
 

2012 films
Indian erotic horror films
2010s Hindi-language films
Indian 3D films
2012 3D films
2012 horror films
Films directed by Vikram Bhatt
Films scored by Jeet Ganguly
Indian sequel films
Fox Star Studios films
Raaz films